Gilbert Mervyn Cawood (4 December 1939 – 28 August 2022) was a New Zealand rower.

Cawood was born in 1939 in Hamilton, New Zealand. He was a foundation member of the Waikato Rowing Club. He represented New Zealand at the 1968 Summer Olympics. He is listed as New Zealand Olympian athlete number 218 by the New Zealand Olympic Committee. At the 1970 World Rowing Championships in St. Catharines in Canada, he won a bronze medal with the coxed eight. He died at Waikato Hospital in Hamilton, on 28 August 2022, at the age of 82.

References

External links

1939 births
2022 deaths
New Zealand male rowers
Rowers at the 1968 Summer Olympics
Olympic rowers of New Zealand
Sportspeople from Hamilton, New Zealand
World Rowing Championships medalists for New Zealand